Jon Kyong-hui (born December 12, 1986 in Pyongyang) is a North Korean long-distance runner. She competed in the marathon at the 2012 Summer Olympics, placing 56th with a time of 2:35:17.

References

1986 births
Living people
North Korean female marathon runners
Olympic athletes of North Korea
Athletes (track and field) at the 2012 Summer Olympics
Sportspeople from Pyongyang
Athletes (track and field) at the 2010 Asian Games
North Korean female long-distance runners
Asian Games competitors for North Korea
20th-century North Korean women
21st-century North Korean women